David Díaz (born June 7, 1976) is an American former professional boxer who competed from 1996 to 2011, and held the WBC lightweight title from 2007 to 2008.

Amateur highlights
Member of the 1996 US Olympic Team as a Light Welterweight. His results were:
Defeated fan favorite Zab Judah (United States) twice within 8 days
Defeated Jacobo Garcia (Virgin Islands) RSC 3 (0:33)
Lost to Oktay Urkal (Germany) 6-14
Won Chicago Golden Gloves four times and the National Golden Gloves three times (1993, 1994 and 1996 National Golden Gloves light welterweight champion)

Professional career
Diaz accumulated an undefeated record of 26-0 before losing to Kendall Holt by TKO in the 8th round. He defeated José Armando Santa Cruz for the interim title on August 12, 2006. On February 20, 2007, Diaz was awarded the title when Joel Casamayor, the champion at the time, was stripped of the title for signing to fight a rematch against WBO champion Acelino Freitas rather than defend against him – it should nevertheless be noted however, that the lightweight title bout between old foes Casamayor and Freitas never took place because Freitas fought and lost his WBO title to WBA champion Juan Díaz instead.

Diaz defeated Mexican legend Erik Morales on August 4, 2007, by a controversial unanimous decision to defend his title. On June 28, 2008, Diaz lost his title to Manny Pacquiao in Las Vegas via 9th-round TKO earning Pacquiao his fifth world championship in five different weight divisions.

After a lay-off that saw Diaz out of the ring for over a year, he returned to face Jesús Chávez on September 26, 2009. He won the fight by majority decision.

On March 13, 2010, Diaz challenged Humberto Soto for his old WBC lightweight title, which had recently been vacated by Edwin Valero, on the undercard of Pacquiao's fight with Joshua Clottey. Soto defeated Diaz, dropping him in the opening and closing rounds, en route to a unanimous decision victory.

Outside the ring
Diaz is involved with mentoring various youth.  He is also active in the Mexican-American community of Chicago. In September 2013, he was the Grand Marshal of the 26th Street Mexican Independence Parade in the Pilsen neighborhood of Chicago. Earlier in that very same year on February 28, 2013, Diaz endorsed friend and former boxer Bill Evans as a candidate for Cook County Sheriff in 2014.

Professional boxing record

References

External links

Lightweight boxers
World Boxing Council champions
Boxers at the 1996 Summer Olympics
Olympic boxers of the United States
Southpaw boxers
Boxers from Chicago
1976 births
Living people
American boxers of Mexican descent
American male boxers
World lightweight boxing champions
Light-welterweight boxers
National Golden Gloves champions